The Initiative is an American video game development company based in Santa Monica, California. As a division of Xbox Game Studios, the company was founded in 2018 to build AAA games for the Xbox consoles and Windows. The company is now working on a new installment in the Perfect Dark series.

History
At E3 2018, Head of Xbox Game Studios announced the formation of The Initiative, a new internal video game development company led by Darrell Gallagher, who had previously served as studio head of Crystal Dynamics. It is the first Microsoft game development studio in Santa Monica. The studio's goal was to create and produce big-budget titles. In addition to Gallagher, the studio recruited several game veterans, including Christian Cantamessa (writer of Red Dead Redemption) and Brian Westergaard (senior producer of 2018's God of War), as well as talents from BioWare, Naughty Dog,  Respawn Entertainment, Santa Monica Studio, Blizzard Entertainment, Insomniac Games and Rockstar Games.

At The Game Awards 2020, it was revealed that the studio is working on a Perfect Dark reboot.

References

External links
 

2018 establishments in California
American companies established in 2018
Companies based in Santa Monica, California
First-party video game developers
Microsoft subsidiaries
Video game companies based in California
Video game companies established in 2018
Video game development companies
Xbox Game Studios